Etidronic acid, also known as etidronate, is a non-nitrogenous bisphosphonate used as a medication, detergent, water treatment, and cosmetic.

It was patented in 1966 and approved for medical use in 1977.

Use

Medical
Etidronic acid is a bisphosphonate used to strengthen bone, treat osteoporosis, and treat Paget's disease of bone.

Bisphosphonates primarily reduce osteoclastic activity, which prevents bone resorption, and thus moves the bone resorption/formation equilibrium toward the formation side and hence makes bone stronger on the long run. Etidronate, unlike other bisphosphonates, also prevents bone calcification. For this reason, other bisphosphonates, such as alendronate, are preferred when fighting osteoporosis. To prevent bone resorption without affecting too much bone calcification, etidronate must be administered only for a short time once in a while, for example for two weeks every 3 months. When given on a continuous basis, say every day, etidronate will altogether prevent bone calcification. This effect may be useful and etidronate is in fact used this way to fight heterotopic ossification. But in the long run, if used on a continuous basis, it will cause osteomalacia.

Chemical

HEDP is used as a retardant in concrete, scale and corrosion inhibition in circulating cool water system, oil field and low-pressure boilers in fields such as electric power, chemical industry, metallurgy, fertilizer, etc. In light woven industry, HEDP is used as detergent for metal and nonmetal. In dyeing industry, HEDP is used as peroxide stabilizer and dye-fixing agent; In non-cyanide electroplating, HEDP is used as chelating agent. The dosage of 1–10 mg/L is preferred as scale inhibitor, 10–50 mg/L as corrosion inhibitor, and 1000–2000 mg/L as detergent. Usually, HEDP is also used together with polycarboxylic acid (superplasticizer), in which it acts as reducing agent.

Chelating agent and antioxidant 
Etidronic acid is a chelating agent and may be added to bind or, to some extent, counter the effects of substances, such as calcium, iron or other metal ions, which may be discharged as a component of grey wastewater and could conceivably contaminate groundwater supplies. As a phosphonate it has corrosion inhibiting properties on unalloyed steel. Etidronic acid also acts to retard rancidification and oxidation of fatty acids.

HEDP and its salts are added to detergents and other cleaning agents to prevent the effects of hard water. It is also used in peroxide bleaching to prevent degradation of peroxides by transition metals.

Etidronic acid is listed as an ingredient of several cosmetic formulations where it is used for suppressing radical formation, emulsion stabiliser and viscosity control. While etidronic acid has not been limited from inclusion in cosmetics and does have legitimate uses, it is recommended that, as with most cosmetic products (particularly soaps), the product should be thoroughly rinsed from the skin after use.

Etidronic acid is also included among swimming pool chemicals. It is used as a stain inhibitor to prevent metal ions coming out of solution and staining the sides of swimming pools.

Etidronic acid is used in bars of soap.

Pharmacology

Synthesis
Etidronic acid can be prepared by reaction of Phosphorus trichloride with acetic acid in a tertiary amine, or by reaction of an acetic acid/acetic anhydride mixture with phosphorous acid.

References

Bisphosphonates
Chelating agents